Michael Allen Lambert (born April 14, 1974, in Honolulu, Hawaii) is an American volleyball player, who was a member of the United States men's national volleyball team that finished in ninth place at the 1996 Summer Olympics in Atlanta, Georgia and eleventh at the 2000 Olympics.

Lambert was born in Kaneohe, Hawaii. He went to Punahou School along with Stein Metzger. His subsequent partnership with Metzger in the AVP resulted in 9 titles.

Lambert graduated from Stanford University in 1997 with a degree in political science. He and fellow AVP player Matt Fuerbringer were members of the 1997 NCAA National Championship team for volleyball.

In the 2005 AVP Tour, Lambert won the best men's player after winning the AVP Aquafina Las Vegas Shootout at the Hard Rock Hotel.
Currently, Lambert lives in Sanremo (Italy) with his wife, Deborah, and their two children.

References

External links
 AVP Profile
 Profile

1974 births
Living people
American men's volleyball players
PAOK V.C. players
Volleyball players at the 1996 Summer Olympics
Volleyball players at the 2000 Summer Olympics
Olympic volleyball players of the United States
Punahou School alumni
Volleyball players from Honolulu
Stanford Cardinal men's volleyball players